The following events occurred in February 1985:

February 1, 1985 (Friday)
Aeroflot Flight 7841 crashes shortly after takeoff on a domestic passenger flight from Minsk to Leningrad, as a result of engine failure caused by the icy conditions, killing 58 of those on board; 22 survive.

February 2, 1985 (Saturday)
Skater Brian Boitano wins the first of his four men's US national figure skating titles at the Kemper Arena in Kansas City, Missouri.

February 3, 1985 (Sunday)
The 1985 Masters snooker tournament is won by Cliff Thorburn of Canada, at the Wembley Conference Centre in the UK.
The BMW Challenge women's tennis tournament concludes at Marco Island, Florida, United States; the singles title is won by Bonnie Gadusek, who is also a losing finalist in the doubles.
Died: Frank Oppenheimer, 72, US physicist, of lung cancer

February 4, 1985 (Monday)
US TV channel NBC becomes the first commercial television network to use satellite interconnection for its stations, and the first to discontinue the use of chime intonations to mark the beginning of each broadcast.
Julius Erving of the Philadelphia 76ers moved into fourth place on pro basketball's all-time scoring list with a 23 point effort as the 76ers beat the Atlanta Hawks 106-92. His 23 points give him 27,113 points, one ahead of Dan Issel of the Denver Nuggets who was still active.

February 5, 1985 (Tuesday)
The Gibraltar–Spain border is permanently opened for the first time since its closure in 1969 by former Spanish leader Francisco Franco.
The United States of America withdraws from a planned ANZUS naval exercise after New Zealand refuses to allow nuclear-capable warships to call at its ports. Australia also cancels its involvement in U.S.-led MX missile tests.
Born: Cristiano Ronaldo, Portuguese footballer, in Funchal, Madeira

February 6, 1985 (Wednesday)
Died: James Hadley Chase, 78, English thriller novelist

February 7, 1985 (Thursday)
U.S. drug enforcement officer Enrique "Kiki" Camarena is kidnapped in Mexico by drug traffickers while on his way to meet his wife.
The US crab-fishing vessel El Rancho capsizes and sinks in the Gulf of Alaska near Alaska′s Kodiak Island. A United States Coast Guard helicopter rescues the five crew.
Died: Francis Affleck, 34, Canadian racing driver, of injuries sustained in an accident during practice for the Daytona ARCA 200 motor race, at Daytona International Speedway in the United States.

February 8, 1985 (Friday)
The expendable rocket Ariane 3, developed by the European Space Agency (ESA), is successfully launched for the third time, at the Guiana Space Centre in Kourou, carrying two satellites, Arabsat-1A and Brasilsat-A1.
The Polish cargo ship Busko Zdroj capsizes and sinks off Sylt, West Germany. Only one of her 25 crew survives.

February 9, 1985 (Saturday)
Died: Enrique "Kiki" Camarena, 37, US intelligence officer, murdered by drug traffickers Miguel Ángel Félix Gallardo, Ernesto Fonseca Carrillo and others are later convicted of his murder.

February 10, 1985 (Sunday)
The wrecked Argentine Balao-class submarine Santa Fe, captured during the Falklands War three years earlier is scuttled by British forces in the South Atlantic Ocean off South Georgia Island.
The FIS Alpine World Ski Championships 1985 conclude in Bromio, Italy, with Switzerland ending top of the medals table.

February 11, 1985 (Monday)
Despite a direction by the judge, Sir Anthony McCowan, "that the jury should convict him", British civil servant Clive Ponting is found not guilty by a jury at the Old Bailey of an offence under the Official Secrets Act. Ponting had leaked information about the sinking of the Argentine navy warship General Belgrano, a key incident in the 1982 Falklands War.
Died: Ben Abruzzo, 54, US balloonist, his wife and four other passengers, killed when the Cessna 421C Abruzzo is piloting hits treetops and crashes at Albuquerque, New Mexico, as a result of a baggage door opening in flight.

February 12, 1985 (Tuesday)
The 1985 South Korean legislative election ends in a narrow victory for the Democratic Justice Party.

February 13, 1985 (Wednesday)
Sri Lankan rebel group, the Tamil Tigers, launch the "Kokkilai offensive", their first organised attack on the army.

February 14, 1985 (Thursday)
Lebanon hostage crisis: CNN journalist Jerry Levin escapes from captivity in Beqaa Valley, Lebanon, where he had been held by Shia militants for nearly a year.
The US fishing vessel Alert, suffering from heavy icing in the Shelikof Strait and bound for Bumble Bay on Alaska′s Kodiak Island, disappears with the loss of her crew of five.

February 15, 1985 (Friday)
The 35th Berlin International Film Festival opens, running until February 26. It includes a retrospective dedicated to Special effects.
Died: Harold Jefferson Coolidge Jr., 81, US zoologist, of complications after a fall

February 16, 1985 (Saturday)
UK civil servant Clive Ponting, acquitted of a charge of breaching section 2 of the Official Secrets Act 1911 concerning the leaking of documents relating to the sinking of the ARA General Belgrano during the Falklands War, resigns from the Ministry of Defence.

February 17, 1985 (Sunday)
The annual Daytona 500 motor race takes place at Daytona International Speedway, Florida, United States, and is won by Bill Elliott.
The 1985 Argentine Primera División football competition begins, continuing until September 4.
UK band Tears For Fears releases the Songs from the Big Chair album, which later achieves multi-platinum status in both the UK and the US.

February 18, 1985 (Monday)
The 1985 Virginia Slims of California indoor tennis tournament begins in Oakland, California, United States, continuing until February 24.
 BBC One retires its outdated Noddy camera system and its Mirror Globe ident in favor of the COW Globe at 7 pm.

February 19, 1985 (Tuesday)
54-year-old William J. Schroeder, one of the first recipients of an artificial heart, becomes the first to be discharged from hospital.
Iberia Flight 610, a Boeing 727-256 named Alhambra de Granada, crashes as a result of striking a television antenna on the summit of Mount Oiz in Biscay, Spain; all 148 people on board are killed. It is the most serious accident in the airline's history. 
China Airlines Flight 006, a Boeing 747 with 284 people on board on a daily non-stop flight from Taipei to Los Angeles, suffers an aircraft upset at 40,000 feet. The pilot recovers control after a 30,000-foot (9,146 m) plunge over the Pacific Ocean near San Francisco. Twenty-four people are injured, two of them seriously.
The first episode of BBC TV's long-running soap opera EastEnders is broadcast in the UK.

February 20, 1985 (Wednesday)
While visiting the United States, UK prime minister Margaret Thatcher addresses a Joint Meeting of Congress.

February 21, 1985 (Thursday)
Died: Louis Hayward, 75, South African-born actor, from lung cancer

February 22, 1985 (Friday)
Died: Efrem Zimbalist, 95, Russian-born violinist, composer, conductor and music director

February 23, 1985 (Saturday)
February 1985 Paris bombing: A bomb planted in a Marks & Spencer department store on the Boulevard Haussmann in Paris, France, kills an employee and injures 15 others.

February 24, 1985 (Sunday)
Polar 3, a survey and research plane operated by the Alfred Wegener Institute for Polar and Marine Research, is shot down over Western Sahara south of Dakhla, by the Polisario Front, while en route to West Germany from Antarctica, killing all three on board.

February 25, 1985 (Monday)
The pound sterling closed at an all-time low (as of September 2022) of USD1.054. The fall in the rate was primarily the result of U.S. Dollar strength, not British pound weakness.
In the Indian state of Gujarat, a general strike called by the All-Gujarat Educational Reform Action Committee (AGERAC) receives limited support. 
Norwegian spy Arne Treholt goes on trial is Oslo, accused of treason and espionage on behalf of the Soviet Union and Iraq.
The 1985 Pilot Pen Classic tennis tournament concludes at La Quinta, California, United States, with Larry Stefanki victorious in the Men's Singles competition.
Born: Benji Marshall, New Zealand rugby league player, in Whakatane

February 26, 1985 (Tuesday)
The 27th Annual Grammy Awards ceremony takes place in Los Angeles, hosted by John Denver. Lionel Richie's Can't Slow Down wins Album of the Year, and Tina Turner's "What's Love Got to Do with It" wins two awards: Record of the Year and Song of the Year. Cyndi Lauper wins Best New Artist. Other winners include Samuel Barber, Plácido Domingo and John Williams.
The small vessel Tagukak is destroyed by fire in the Gulf of Alaska off Spruce Cape on Kodiak Island. Her crew are rescued by a ferry.
Died: Tjalling Koopmans, 74, Dutch economist and Nobel laureate

February 27, 1985 (Wednesday)
Died: David Huffman, 39, US actor, stabbed by a 16-year-old high school student, Genaro Samano Villanueva, who was attempting to evade arrest for an attempted burglary

February 28, 1985 (Thursday)
1985 Newry mortar attack: The Provisional Irish Republican Army carries out a mortar attack on a police station at Newry in Northern Ireland. With nine officers dead, it is the highest loss of life ever suffered by the Royal Ulster Constabulary on a single day.
Died: Charita Bauer, 62, US soap actress

References

1985
1983-02
1985-02